"And the Cradle Will Rock..." is a song written and performed by Van Halen. It appears on their 1980 album Women and Children First and was released as a single. It is also the first song released by the band that featured the keyboard playing of Eddie Van Halen.

Chuck Klosterman of Vulture.com ranked it the 50th-best Van Halen song, writing "I’ve always found it a bit ponderous and uncompromisingly average, but I’ve also listened to it somewhere in the vicinity of 8,000 times."

Composition
The song begins with what sounds like a guitar, but is, in fact, a flanger-effected Wurlitzer electric piano played through Eddie Van Halen's 1960s model 100-watt Marshall Plexi amplifier. During live performances on the 1980 tour, Michael Anthony would play the keyboards.

Reception
Cash Box called the song a "tongue-in-cheek anthem," saying that "David Lee Roth's acrobatic vocal leaps are in fine form," that Eddie Van Halen provides "sonic lead guitar blasts" and that the song has "industrial strength rhythms."

Eric Carr of KISS played "And the Cradle Will Rock..." along with Van Halen's cover of "You Really Got Me" as part of his audition tape, which successfully led to his becoming the new drummer for KISS.

Charts

References

Further reading

Van Halen songs
1980 singles
Song recordings produced by Ted Templeman
Songs written by Michael Anthony (musician)
Songs written by Alex Van Halen
Songs written by Eddie Van Halen
Songs written by David Lee Roth
1980 songs
Warner Records singles